This is a list of all the United States Supreme Court cases from volume 428 of the United States Reports:

External links

1976 in United States case law